Senator Singleton may refer to:

Bobby Singleton (fl. 2000s–2020s), Alabama State Senate
Marvin Singleton (born 1939), Missouri State Senate
Otho R. Singleton (1814–1889), Mississippi State Senate
Troy Singleton (born 1973), New Jersey Senate